Pelacha (Redsonja Records) is a Spanish DJ, producer, record label owner and events promoter.

Musical career 
Pelacha is a Dj from Spain, she started her career as a DJ at the end of the 80’s in Madrid. She was resident dj in many of Madrid’s clubs that have marked a before and after in the electronic scene like Consulado, Epsilon, Arena, Davai, Surface (Sala Groove).

Pelacha has played two times in Awakenings Festival. She is resident dj and promoter of Techno Cracks! and 100% Femenine.

Producer 
Pelacha runs her own record label Redsonja Records which releases on digital and vinyl format. The scotch RUBADUB is in charge for the distribution. Pelacha has been remixed by artists such as Heiko Laux

Discography 
 One a different Club. Mix CD. Aire Music Label.
 Yo DJ DVD. Showcase set.
 TechnoMad Mix CD.
 Universo DJs. Mix CD. Vale Music.
 Pelacha “GiveMoreGetMore” Lessismore Recordings, 2009
 Pelacha “Nueva Era” Inout Records, 2009
 PELACHA_PLAYGROUND 08 EP
 PLAYGROUND 03, PELACHA AND FRIENDS
 Pelacha 'Nueva Serie' Inout Records 7-2009
 Pelacha 'Acid Troops Feat Vasco' Inout Records 7-2009
 Pelacha 'GET UP' RedSonja Records 01-2010
 Pelacha 'GET UP REMIXES' RedSonja Records 02-2010
 Pelacha 'Funny Friends' RedSonja Records 03-2011
 Pelacha 'Studio' Redsonja Records 04-2012
 Pelacha - Hd Substance 'Total Black' Voodoo Soul records 5-2012
 Pelacha 'Waterfalls of Sounds' Silent Clap Music Label 5-2012
 Pelacha 'Metaphors ep' NuLabel 11-2012
 Pelacha 'Deslazados' Software Records 12-2012
 Pelacha ‘Studio’ Redsonja Records 2012
 Pelacha ‘Botánica 01’ Redsonja Records 01-2014
 Pelacha ‘Botánica 02’ Redsonja Records 04-2014
 Pelacha ‘Obediencia Ep’ I-Traxx Recording 05-2014
 MendezisMZ ‘Blue Level Pelacha Remix’ Caledor Records 07-2014
 Pelacha ‘Botánica 03’ Redsonja Records 09-2014
 Buenavida ‘Steel landscape Pelacha Remix’ Redsonja Records 01-2015
 Pelacha ‘10’ Glider Records 09-2015
 ‘Construction & Decostruction’ Caledor Records 01 – 2016
 ‘Pelacha Isa/Viole’ Redsonja Records 5-2016
 Pelacha 'Valores' Redsonja Records 05 - 2017

References 

Women DJs
Spanish DJs
Living people
Spanish women musicians
Spanish house musicians
Women in electronic music
Spanish record producers
Women record producers
Year of birth missing (living people)